Darwinia sanguinea is a species of flowering plant in the myrtle family Myrtaceae and is endemic to the south-west of Western Australia.

This species was first formally described in 1857 by Carl Meissner who gave it the name Genetyllis sanguinea in the Journal of the Proceedings of the Linnean Society, Botany from material collected near the Hill River by James Drummond. In 1865, George Bentham changed the name to Darwinia sanguinea in a later edition of the same journal. The specific epithet (sanguinea) means "blood-coloured", referring to the flowers.

This darwinia is often found on hills and sandplains between Coorow, Carnamah and Dandaragan in the Geraldton Sandplains and Swan Coastal Plain bioregions of south-western Western Australia where it grows in sandy soils over laterite.

References

sanguinea
Endemic flora of Western Australia
Myrtales of Australia
Rosids of Western Australia
Plants described in 1857
Taxa named by Carl Meissner